Josef Lukl Hromádka (8 June 1889 in Hodslavice – 26 December 1969 in Prague) was a Czech Protestant theologian. He was a founder of the Christian Peace Conference.

Born into a Lutheran peasant family in a village in Moravia in the Austro-Hungarian Empire, Hromádka studied theology in Vienna, Basel and Heidelberg, as well as in Aberdeen. He was a supporter of and member from its foundation in 1918 of the unified Evangelical Church of Czech Brethren.

In 1939 Hromádka fled the Nazis into exile, taking up a post at Princeton Theological Seminary in the United States. He returned to Prague in 1947 to resume his post at the Comenius theological faculty.

A founder of the Christian Peace Conference, he called the 1968 Soviet-led invasion of Czechoslovakia 'the greatest tragedy of my life'. He left the movement in November 1968.

Literature
http://journals.ptsem.edu/id/PSB1999201/dmd008 Tribute by Jan Milic Lochmann, The Princeton Seminary Bulletin, 1999

1889 births
1969 deaths
People from Nový Jičín District
People from the Margraviate of Moravia
Czech Lutherans
Czech theologians
Christian Peace Conference members
Lenin Peace Prize recipients